United Nations Security Council Resolution 1839 was unanimously adopted on 9 October 2008.

Resolution 
Unanimously adopting resolution 1839 (2008), the Council took no other decisions through its action, though it referred to the Secretary General’s most recent report, in which he observes that, following the recent Russian–Georgian conflict in South Ossetia, UNOMIG’s area of responsibility is unclear.

In the report, the Secretary-General recommends a technical, four-month extension of the Mission, which for the past 14 years has been entrusted with overseeing the ceasefire accord between Georgia’s Government and Abkhaz separatists in the north-western part of the country.

See also
Russo-Georgian War
South Ossetia
United Nations

References

External links 
 
Text of the Resolution at undocs.org

 1839
South Ossetia
 1839
October 2008 events
2008 in Georgia (country)